is a Japanese kayōkyoku singer. She also sings jazz, chanson, canzone, and min'yō. She made her debut in 2005. She attended the 59th NHK Kōhaku Uta Gassen. Her song  reached number-one on the Japan's Oricon charts in January 2009. By this, she became the eldest singer to reach the number-one position on single charts in Oricon history. The single was on the charts for 64 weeks and sold 568,334 copies during that time.

Discography

Albums 
  (2006)
 Second Story (2008)
  (2009)
 Encore: Jazz Standard (2010)
  
  
  
 Junko Akimoto BEST (2014)

Singles 
  (2005)
  (2007)
  (2008)
  (2009)
  (2010)
  
  
  
  
  (2015)
 "Rose" (2015)
  (2016)

References

External links 
  Official website

1947 births
Living people
Japanese women pop singers
Japanese women jazz singers
Singers from Tokyo
21st-century Japanese singers
21st-century Japanese women singers